The red-vented barbet (Psilopogon lagrandieri) is an Asian barbet native to Laos, Vietnam and Cambodia, where it inhabits subtropical or tropical moist lowland forest and subtropical or tropical moist montane forests.

Description
Its plumage is green to bronze-coloured. Its head is brown with greyish patches on the throat and sides and a blue line above the eyes. It has a red patch below the tail.

Diet
In the Lac Boc Forest of Lâm Đồng Province, Vietnam, it consumes the fruit of Ficus sp., Litsea cubeba, Campylospermum serratum, Cinnamomum sp. and Knema sp., flowers of Wrightia sp., numerous invertebrates and some vertebrates.

References

red-vented barbet
Birds of Laos
Birds of Vietnam
red-vented barbet
Taxonomy articles created by Polbot